Stefan Stoykov is a Bulgarian Olympic javelin thrower. He represented his country in the men's javelin throw at the 1980 Summer Olympics. He threw 78.74m in the qualifiers and a 79.04m in the finals.

References

Living people
1951 births
Bulgarian male javelin throwers
Olympic athletes of Bulgaria
Athletes (track and field) at the 1980 Summer Olympics